Will Crummer is a Cook Islands singer and entertainer who was well known in the 1960s in both Auckland, New Zealand, and the Cook Islands. He released EPs and albums during the 1960s, and along with Pepe and the Rarotongans, was a pioneering Cook Islands artist. His is also the father of singer Annie Crummer.

Background
In his teens, Crummer climbed coconut trees in his village to sing songs he had heard on the radio, including songs by Pat Boone and Nat King Cole. He moved to New Zealand in the early 1960s to work as a concreter, a job his brother had arranged for him.
 
Crummer became well known in Auckland during the 1960s when the Polynesian music scene was popular. The band he became known for fronting was Will Crummer and the Royal Rarotongans,  performing at venues such as The Orange Ballroom and The Reefcomber.

He made some recordings in Auckland, his EP Rarotonga in 1962 and Cook Islands Magic the following year. He also 
released Romantic Rarotonga and Love Songs of Polynesia.

In 1968, Viking Records issued the compilation Action Rarotonga!, which featured his group, Will Crummer and The Royal Rarotongans, as well as Pepe and The Rarotongans.

Crummer performed in Tahiti, and Hawaii where he was offered a residency by a Hawaiian promoter. After performing there for a  time, he broke his contract for personal reasons and headed back to New Zealand where he found work in warehousing.  According to his daughter Annie, he gave up music to raise his family.

Later years
In 2011, Ode Records released his album Shoebox Lovesongs. Produced by Nick Bollinger and Arthur Baysting, it features his old friend Dinky Ngatipa and a string arrangement by Don McGlashan. Daughter Annie and The Yandall Sisters also feature on the album.

On Saturday, 25 January 2015, Crummer and his band, Will Crummer and the Rarotongans performed aboard HMNZS Otago to an audience of around 10,000. His daughter Annie was also at the event.

Discography

References

Viking Records artists
Cook Islands music
Cook Islands musicians